Admiral Loredan may refer to:

Alvise Loredan (1393–1466), Venetian admiral
Giorgio Loredan (died 1475), Venetian admiral
Pietro Loredan (1372–1438), Venetian admiral